Drayton is an unincorporated community and census-designated place (CDP) in Spartanburg County, in the U.S. state of South Carolina. It was first listed as a CDP in the 2020 census with a population of 1,115.

History
A post office called Drayton has been in operation since 1904. The community was named for William Henry Drayton (1742–1779), a South Carolina delegate to Continental Congress.

Education
Spartanburg County School District 7 serve Drayton. It operates Spartanburg High School.

Demographics

2020 census

Note: the US Census treats Hispanic/Latino as an ethnic category. This table excludes Latinos from the racial categories and assigns them to a separate category. Hispanics/Latinos can be of any race.

References

Unincorporated communities in Spartanburg County, South Carolina
Unincorporated communities in South Carolina